Nkechi Opara (born 13 December 1995) is a Nigerian weightlifter. She competed in the women's 48 kg event at the 2014 Commonwealth Games where she won a bronze medal.

References 

1995 births
Living people
Nigerian female weightlifters
Commonwealth Games bronze medallists for Nigeria
Commonwealth Games medallists in weightlifting
Weightlifters at the 2014 Commonwealth Games
20th-century Nigerian women
21st-century Nigerian women
Medallists at the 2014 Commonwealth Games